Perthshire South and Kinross-shire is a constituency of the Scottish Parliament (Holyrood) covering part of the council area of Perth and Kinross. It elects one Member of the Scottish Parliament (MSP) by the plurality (first past the post) method of election. It is one of nine constituencies in the Mid Scotland and Fife electoral region, which elects seven additional members, in addition to the nine constituency MSPs, to produce a form of proportional representation for the region as a whole.

The seat has been held by Jim Fairlie of the Scottish National Party since the 2021 Scottish Parliament election.

Electoral region 

The other eight constituencies of the Mid Scotland and Fife region are Clackmannanshire and Dunblane, Cowdenbeath, Dunfermline, Kirkcaldy, Mid Fife and Glenrothes, North East Fife, Perthshire North and Stirling.

The region covers all of the Clackmannanshire council area, all of the Fife council area, all of the Perth and Kinross council area and all of the Stirling council area.

Constituency boundaries and council area 

The Perth and Kinross council area is represented in the Scottish Parliament by two constituencies, Perthshire North and Perthshire South and Kinross-shire, defined by the 2011 first periodical review of Scottish Parliament constituencies. Prior to this, Perth and Kinross was represented by three constituencies in the Scottish Parliament, which were used from the opening of the Parliament in 1999 until the 2011 Scottish Parliament election, these were: North Tayside, Perth and Ochil.

The electoral wards used in Perthshire South and Kinross-shire are:

Strathearn
Strathallan
Kinross-shire
Almond and Earn
Perth City South
Perth City North

Constituency profile 
BBC profile:

The Perthshire South and Kinross-shire constituency covers the southern half of the Perth and Kinross council area, forming its northern boundaries with the Perthshire North constituency following the River Almond and the River Tay east of Perth. The seat covers a majority of the city of Perth to the north-east, covering the western side of the city from Dunkeld Road and the railway line.

Member of the Scottish Parliament

Election results

2020s

2010s

2000s: Notional Result
The following is the notional result for the 2007 Scottish Parliament election, as calculated by the BBC.

Footnotes

External links

Constituencies of the Scottish Parliament
Politics of Perth and Kinross
2011 establishments in Scotland
Constituencies established in 2011
Scottish Parliament constituencies and regions from 2011
Kinross
Politics of Perth, Scotland
Auchterarder
Crieff
Bridge of Earn